Not So Stupid (French: Pas si bête) is a 1928 French silent comedy film directed by André Berthomieu and starring Andrée Gilda, René Lefèvre, and Jean Heuzé. Berthomieu remade the film in 1946.

Cast
 Andrée Gilda 
 René Lefèvre 
 Jean Heuzé 
 Madeleine Carroll 
 Jean Diéner 
 Hubert Daix 
 Charles Frank

References

Bibliography
 Alfred Krautz. International Directory of Cinematographers Set and Costume Designers in Film: France. Saur, 1983.

External links

1928 films
1928 comedy films
French comedy films
Films directed by André Berthomieu
French silent films
French black-and-white films
Silent comedy films
1920s French films
1920s French-language films